George Stocking may refer to:
 George W. Stocking Sr. (1892–1975), American economist
 George W. Stocking Jr. (1928–2013), American anthropologist